One Piece: Pirate Warriors 4 is an action-adventure video game developed by Omega Force and published by Bandai Namco Entertainment for Nintendo Switch, PlayStation 4, Windows, and Xbox One. It is the fourth installment in Pirate Warriors video-game series, based on the One Piece franchise. It is a sequel to the 2015 game One Piece: Pirate Warriors 3. It was released on March 27, 2020.

Gameplay 
The game features game play similar to the previous installments. The game has its own original story that takes the Wano arc from One Piece and changes it. It also features four new multiplayer modes called Giant Boss Battle, Total Bounty Battle, Timed Defense Battle, and Territory Battle .

Original story 
This story takes the unfinished Wano arc and modifies the plot, with Cavendish and Bartolomeo appearing in the arc to help the captured Straw Hat crew escape their cells. As the battle intensifies between Big Mom and Kaido, a new enemy appears in the form of Blackbeard and his crew. Fighting Blackbeard, Big Mom, and Kaido's crew, players are met with a final battle against Kaido who turns into a dragon after defeating Big Mom, Blackbeard, and Kaido's underlings. Luffy must defeat Kaido at the end and end the suffering of Wano that Kaido brings. The story has one ending, so winning is the only option, which plays a cut scene of everyone cheering and celebrating the freedom that Luffy gave to the Wano people. This arc has an original ending while the manga Wano arc was still on going at the time of its release.

Characters 
52 characters are playable in the game, 43 of which are base-game characters , while 9 additional characters were added later via DLC.

 Bartolomeo
 Basil Hawkins
 Boa Hancock
 Borsalino
 Brook
 Buggy
 Capone Bege
 Carrot
 Cavendish
 Charlotte Cracker (DLC)
 Charlotte Katakuri
 Charlotte Linlin
 Charlotte Smoothie (DLC)
 Crocodile
 Donquixote Doflamingo
 Dracule Mihawk
 Edward Newgate
 Emporio Ivankov
 Eustass Kid
 Franky
 Issho
 Jimbei
 Kaido
 Kikunojo (DLC)
 Killer (DLC)
 Kin'emon (DLC)
 Kozuki Oden  (DLC)
 Kuzan
 Marco
 Marshall D. Teach
 Monkey D. Luffy
 Nami
 Nico Robin
 Portgas D. Ace
 Rob Lucci
 Roronoa Zoro
 Sabo
 Sakazuki
 Sanji
 Shanks
 Smoker
 Tashigi
 Tony Tony Chopper
 Trafalgar Law
 Urouge (DLC)
 Usopp
 Vinsmoke Ichiji
 Vinsmoke Judge (DLC)
 Vinsmoke Niji
 Vinsmoke Reiju
 Vinsmoke Yonji
 X. Drake (DLC)

Development 
On July 5, 2019, the game was announced at Anime Expo 2019 with a reveal trailer.

On November 27, 2019 an interview was done with a brand manager for Bandai Namco Entertainment who knew how the game was being developed. The interview was conducted by Bleeding Cool, a news site that mostly covers games, comics, TV, and films. Randy Le talks about how the game returning to the series is something they wanted to bring back for awhile. Randy Le goes on to talk about combat and the different enemies in the game: giant enemies, fast, and even more character battles than the past Pirate Warriors game. Randy Le does not answer any of the other questions asked to prevent spoilers.

Reception

Critical response 

IGN Mitchell Saltzman gave the game a score of 8 out of 10, saying "Pirate Warriors 4 is a great One Piece-flavored spin on the Musou genre with a deep roster and simple but fun combat".

Sales 
The PlayStation 4 version of One Piece: Pirate Warriors 4 was the second best-selling retail game during its first week on sale in Japan, with 75,998 copies being sold. The Switch version was the third bestselling retail game during the same week, selling 61,571 copies. , One Piece: Pirate Warriors 4 has sold over 1 million copies, becoming the fastest entry in the Pirate Warriors series to achieve that milestone. As of August 2022, it has sold over 2 million copies.

See also 
 List of One Piece video games

Notes

References

External links 
Official Japanese website
Official English website

2020 video games
Action-adventure games
Bandai Namco games
Nintendo Switch games
Pirate Warriors 4
One Piece: Pirate Warriors
PlayStation 4 games
Video games developed in Japan
Windows games
Xbox One games
Video games related to anime and manga
Multiplayer and single-player video games
Video games with downloadable content
Video game sequels
Omega Force games